Coming Home Again is a 2019 American-South Korean drama film directed by Wayne Wang and starring Justin Chon. It is based on a 1995 New Yorker essay by Chang-Rae Lee, who co-wrote the screenplay with Wang. The film premiered as part of the 2019 Toronto International Film Festival.

The film follows Chang-rae, a first-generation Korean-American who returns to his childhood home in San Francisco to care for his ailing mother.

Cast
Justin Chon as Chang-rae
Jackie Chung as Mom
Christina July Kim as Jiyoung
John Lie as Dad

Release
The film had its world premiere on September 7, 2019, at the 2019 Toronto International Film Festival, and was released on DVD and VOD in the United States on March 2, 2021.

Reception

References

External links
 
 
 Official site at Outsider Pictures
 “Coming Home Again” essay at The New Yorker

Films about Korean Americans
American drama films
South Korean drama films
Films directed by Wayne Wang
2019 drama films
Films set in San Francisco
Films about mother–son relationships
Asian-American drama films
2010s English-language films
2010s American films
2010s South Korean films
2019 independent films